Holy Family Memorial is a non-profit healthcare system headquartered in Manitowoc, Wisconsin. The system operates a hospital and other healthcare facilities throughout Manitowoc and Sheboygan counties in the state of Wisconsin. Holy Family Memorial is recognized as the largest provider of healthcare services in Manitowoc County.

History 
The Franciscan Sisters of Christian Charity founded Holy Family Memorial in 1899.
 
In March 2020, Froedtert Health of Wauwatosa announced its intentions to acquire a minority interest in HFM. In January 2021, Froedtert acquired a majority membership interest in Holy Family Memorial Medical Center.

See also 
 Franciscan Sisters of Christian Charity
 Froedtert Health

References

External links 
 Official website
 

Health care companies based in Wisconsin
Hospital networks in the United States
Non-profit organizations based in Wisconsin